Mortlake Crematorium is a crematorium in Kew, near its boundary with Mortlake, in the London Borough of Richmond upon Thames. It opened in 1939, next to Mortlake Cemetery.

The crematorium serves the boroughs of Ealing, Hammersmith & Fulham, Hounslow and Richmond upon Thames in the west and south-west of London. It is managed by a board made up of three elected councillors from each of these four boroughs.

Citing it as "a rare example" of Art Deco design in the borough, Richmond upon Thames Council has described it as "a building of exceptional quality and character". Environmentalist Colin Hines describes it as "probably the most undiscovered deco treasure in London". Hilary Grainger, writing in Encyclopedia of Cremation, describes the architectural style as Italianate and the building as having "beautiful cloisters with discrete brick detailing". It has been a Grade II listed building since 2011, being assessed by Historic England as having "a distinctive Art Deco design that survives little altered in a compact and practical composition".

Location
The crematorium is on Kew Meadow Path, Townsmead Road, Kew. It is situated on the south bank of the River Thames by Chiswick Bridge and in Clifford Avenue, adjoining Mortlake Cemetery (Hammersmith New Cemetery) in the angle of Mortlake Road (which forms part of the A205, the South Circular Road) and the A316 road. The nearest train stations are Kew Gardens (for London Underground and London Overground trains) and Mortlake (for South Western Railway services).

History
Mortlake Crematorium was built on the site of Pink's Farm, which had belonged to Richard Atwood, whose family were prominent market gardeners in the area.

It was licensed in 1936 under the Mortlake Crematorium Act 1936, thereby becoming the first to be established
under its own Act of Parliament. Designed by Douglas Barton, borough surveyor to Hammersmith Metropolitan Borough Council, the building was constructed in three years at a cost of £27,000. It was also equipped with a Garden of Remembrance for the burial or scattering of ashes, and also offered panels and niches in which ashes could be deposited. When the facility was finally opened in January 1939 by Lord Horder, the then Physician to the King, he said: "You seem to have eliminated the sombreness of atmosphere which sometimes shrouds buildings such as these". After that, there was very little change in Mortlake Crematorium's outward appearance until 1982, when Colin Gilbert, an architect from Ealing, designed additional gardens between the crematorium and the River Thames. Since 2015 the crematorium has had a memorial garden dedicated to the memory of babies and children, based on Doris Stickley's story "Water Bugs and Dragonflies".

Three new, larger cremators were installed in the crematory in 2012.

Notable cremations

Among those cremated here were:
 Richard Beckinsale (1947–1979), actor
 Tarka Cordell (1966–2008), musician
 Tommy Cooper (1921–1984), comedian and magician
 Sir Robin Day (1923–2000), political broadcaster and commentator
 Roger Delgado (1918–1973), British actor, most famous for playing The Master in Doctor Who
 Kenny Everett (1944–1995), radio DJ and television entertainer
 Edd Gould (1988–2012), English animator, voice actor and creator of Eddsworld
 Charles Hawtrey (1914–1988), comedy actor
 Valerie Hobson (1917–1998), actress
 John Hutchinson (1884–1972), botanist
 Arthur Koestler (1905–1983), author
 James Edgar Leach (1892–1958), Victoria Cross recipient, World War I
 Charles Lightoller (1874–1952), second officer of the RMS Titanic
 Lord Longford (Frank Pakenham) (1905–2001), politician and social reformer
 Kirsty MacColl (1959–2000), singer-songwriter
 Ernestine Mills (1871–1959), artist, writer and suffragette
 Jimmy Perry (1923–2016), actor and scriptwriter, who devised and co-wrote the BBC television sitcom Dad's Army
 Christopher Price (1967–2002), radio and television broadcaster
 John Profumo (1915–2006), politician, Secretary of State for War
 Sir Michael Redgrave (1908–1985), actor, author and director
 Gordon Reid (1939–2003), Scottish actor
 Prince Alexander Romanov (1929–2002), member of the Russian Imperial Family
 Sir Denis Thatcher, Bt (1915–2003), businessman and husband of Margaret Thatcher
 Margaret Thatcher, Baroness Thatcher (1925–2013), Prime Minister of the United Kingdom
 Alexander Trocchi (1925–1984), Scottish novelist
 Stephen Ward (1912–1963), osteopath and  artist who was one of the central figures in the Profumo affair
 Kit West (1936–2016), special effects artist, known for his work on Raiders of the Lost Ark and Return of the Jedi

World War II memorial
Seventy-seven Commonwealth servicemen of World War II were cremated here and their names are listed on a screen wall memorial erected by the Commonwealth War Graves Commission in the adjoining Mortlake Cemetery (Hammersmith New Cemetery).  They include England rugby international Vivian Davies (1899–1941), who was a Captain in the Royal Artillery.

References

External links
 
 

1939 establishments in England
Art Deco architecture in London
Buildings and structures completed in 1939
Buildings and structures in the London Borough of Richmond upon Thames
Crematoria in England
Crematoria in London
Grade II listed buildings in the London Borough of Richmond upon Thames
Kew, London
Mortlake, London